William de Braose (or William de Briouze), First Lord of Bramber (died 1093/1096) was previously lord of Briouze, Normandy. He was granted lands in England by William the Conqueror soon after he and his followers had invaded and controlled Saxon England.

Norman victor 

Braose had been given extensive lands in Sussex by 1073. He became feudal baron of the Rape of Bramber where he built Bramber Castle. Braose was also awarded lands around Wareham and Corfe in Dorset, two manors in Surrey, Southcote in Berkshire and Downton in Wiltshire, and became one of the most powerful of the new feudal barons of the early Norman era.

He continued to bear arms alongside King William in campaigns in England, and Normandy and Maine in France.

He was a pious man and made considerable grants to the Abbey of Saint Florent, in Saumur, and endowed the foundation of priories at Sele near Bramber and at Briouze.

He was soon occupying a new Norman castle at Bramber, guarding the strategically important harbour at Steyning, and began a vigorous boundary dispute and power struggle with the monks of Fécamp Abbey in Normandy, to whom William the Conqueror had granted Steyning, brought to a head by the Domesday Book, completed in 1086.

Land disputes
Braose built a bridge at Bramber and demanded tolls from ships travelling further along the river to the busy port at Steyning. The monks challenged this, and they also disputed Braose's right to bury people in the churchyard of his new church of Saint Nicholas at Bramber, demanding the burial fees for themselves, despite the church's having been built to serve the castle and not the town. The monks then produced forged documents to defend their position and were unhappy with the failure of their claim on Hastings, which was very similar. They claimed the same freedoms and land tenure in Hastings as King Edward had given them at Steyning. On a technicality, King William was bound to uphold all rights and freedoms held by the abbey before King Edward's death, but the monks had already been expelled ten years before that. William wanted to hold Hastings for himself for strategic reasons, and he ignored the problem until 1085, when he confirmed the abbey's claims to Steyning but compensated it for its claims at Hastings with land in the manor of Bury, near Pulborough in Sussex. In 1086 King William called his sons, barons and bishops to court (the last time an English king presided personally, with his full court, to decide a matter of law) to settle the Steyning disputes, which took a full day. The result was that the abbey won over William de Braose, forcing him to curtail his bridge tolls, to give up various encroachments onto the abbey's lands, including a farmed rabbit warren, a park, 18 burgage tenements, a causeway, and a channel used to fill his moat. Braose also had to organise a mass exhumation of all Bramber's dead, the bodies being transferred to the abbey's churchyard of Saint Cuthman's in Steyning.

Progeny
William de Braose was succeeded as Lord of Bramber by his son, Philip de Braose, and started an important Anglo-Norman dynasty (see House of Braose).

Death
William de Braose was present in 1093 at the consecration of a church in Briouze, his manor of origin whence originates his family name, thus he was still alive in that year. However, his son Philip was issuing charters as Lord of Bramber in 1096, indicating that William de Braose died sometime between 1093 and 1096.

References

External links
The Braose website

1096 deaths
Anglo-Normans
Norman warriors
Year of birth unknown
Feudal barons of Bramber
People from Bramber